The canton of Athis-Mons is an administrative division of the Essonne department, Île-de-France region, northern France. Its borders were modified at the French canton reorganisation which came into effect in March 2015. Its seat is in Athis-Mons.

It consists of the following communes:
Athis-Mons
Juvisy-sur-Orge
Paray-Vieille-Poste

References

Cantons of Essonne